Lip compression may refer to:
Roundedness, lip rounding in vowels
Labialization, lip rounding in consonants

Linguistics disambiguation pages